British Libyans are citizens or residents of the United Kingdom that are of Libyan ancestry. British-Libyans may also include children born in the United Kingdom to a British (or of any other origin) parent and a Libyan parent.

Demographics 
The 2011 UK Census recorded 14,284 Libyan-born residents in England, 762 in Wales, 1,327 in Scotland and 79 in Northern Ireland. Manchester is home to the largest Libyan population in the UK, with estimates going between 5,000 and 10,000 people of Libyan descent.

Notable British-Libyans or Libyans residing in the United Kingdom 

 Ali Omar Ermes: writer and artist whose art has been showcased across The British Museum and Tate Britain.
 Asia Alfasi: artist and manga-influenced comic writer. She is the first female to participant and win on Hi8us Midlands Stripsearch competition and is a recipient of an award from the International Manga and Anime Festival (IMAF).

 Hisham Matar: writer and novelist. He is a recipient of the Pulitzer Prize (2017) and PEN America Jean Stein Book Award.
 Mohammed El Senussi: son of Crown Prince Hasan as-Senussi of Libya.
 Tarek Ben Halim: former investment banker and founder of Alfanar; an Arab venture philanthropy organisation for development in the Arab region.

Associations or Community Centres 
 Libyan Youth Association, Manchester

Community Arabic schools  

 London Libyan School
 Leeds Libyan School
 Manchester Libyan School
 Leicester Libyan School
 Cardiff Libyan School
 Glasgow Libyan School
 Newcastle Libyan School

Media 
 Hiwar Mushtark Show: Arabic برنامح حوار مشترك : an audience-panel debate show where British-Libyans and Libyans in the UK come and discuss issues of their community in UK and issues of Libya. The program ran across a number of seasons.

See also 
 British Arabs
 The Council for Arab-British Understanding

References 

Demographics of the United Kingdom